Gibraltar's first Constitution was passed in 1950. A complete list of the different constitutions follows.

Gibraltar Constitution Order 1950
Gibraltar Constitution Order 1964
Gibraltar Constitution Order 1969
Gibraltar Constitution Order 2006

See also
Politics of Gibraltar
2006 Gibraltarian constitutional referendum

External links 
Gibraltar Constitution Order 1969
Gibraltar Constitution Order 2006

Politics of Gibraltar
Gibraltar
Gibraltar